Cryptophialidae is a family of Acrothoracican barnacles in the order Cryptophialida, the sole family of the order. There are at least 2 genera and more than 20 described species in Cryptophialidae. These barnacles burrow into calcareous rocks and structures, such as limestone, shells, or corals.

Genera:
 Australophialus Tomlinson, 1969
 Cryptophialus Darwin, 1854

References

Maxillopoda
Crustacean families